Transmitter Żagań/Wichów is a facility for FM and TV situated at Żagań/Wichów in Poland.
It uses as antenna tower a 280 metre tall guyed mast built in 2003.

Transmitted Programmes

Digital TV-Programmes

FM-Radio Programmes

See also
 List of masts

Radio masts and towers in Poland
Żagań County
Buildings and structures in Lubusz Voivodeship
2003 establishments in Poland
Towers completed in 2003